Alessandro Scarioni (8 March 1889 – 22 June 1966) was an Italian professional footballer, who played as a midfielder.

External links 
Profile at MagliaRossonera.it 

1889 births
1966 deaths
Italian footballers
Association football midfielders
A.C. Milan players
A.C. Monza managers